Bessie Bamber was a British artist from Birkenhead who was active between 1900 and 1910. It is not known if Bamber was her married name or maiden name.

Bessie Bamber worked in oils and specialised in painting cats, kittens and occasionally puppies. She usually painted on porcelain or opaline glass, and sometimes on a polished mahogany panel. She preferred to work using stuffed animals rather than live ones. There is no record of her exhibiting her paintings. A picture of three kittens with a pile of books was sold for £2,468 by Bonhams in 2004.

References

External links
Bamber's Kittens
Bessie Bamber on Artnet
Biography (J. Collins & Son, antiques)
Two Collies Jock and Lucy; and Best friends, two spaniels (Christie's - sale notice)
Kittens (Christie's - sale notice)
Kitten in a Blue China Bowl (Art.co.uk]
Eight Kittens (Oil on walnut panel, 1910 - Hamshere Gallery, London)

English women painters
Animal artists
People from Birkenhead
Year of death missing
19th-century British women artists
19th-century English women
19th-century English people